Georg Kunisch (21 April 1893 – 1936) was a German freestyle swimmer who competed in the 1912 Summer Olympics. He was born and died in Breslau. In 1912 he was eliminated in the first round of the 100 metre freestyle event. He was also a member of the German relay team which finished fourth in the 4x200 metre freestyle relay competition.

References

External links

1893 births
1936 deaths
German male swimmers
German male freestyle swimmers
Olympic swimmers of Germany
Swimmers at the 1912 Summer Olympics